Greenville Hole is a circular depression,  deep, in the center of Greenville Valley, Convoy Range, Victoria Land, Antarctica. It was named in association with Greenville Valley.

References

Structural basins of Antarctica
Landforms of Victoria Land
Scott Coast